Volodymyr Ivanovych Lyutyi (born 20 April 1962) is a football coach and a former player from Ukraine.

Career
Lyutyi was born in Dnipropetrovsk. After playing for the Soviet FC Dnipro Dnipropetrovsk, Lyutyi spent almost another ten years playing in Germany for such clubs like Schalke 04, MSV Duisburg, VfL Bochum and SpVgg Unterhaching, and Turkish club Bursaspor.

He earned six caps for USSR and CIS from 1990 to 1992, and played in the 1990 FIFA World Cup and the 1992 UEFA European Football Championship. He also won a gold medal in the 1988 Olympics.

Honours
 Soviet Top League: 1983, 1988; runner-up 1987
 Soviet Cup: 1989
 USSR Federation Cup: 1986, 1989
 USSR Super Cup: 1989

References

External links
 
 Profile at RussiaTeam 
 Ljuty in Bundesliga

1962 births
Living people
Footballers from Dnipro
Soviet footballers
Ukrainian footballers
Association football midfielders
Association football forwards
Soviet Union international footballers
1990 FIFA World Cup players
UEFA Euro 1992 players
Olympic medalists in football
Medalists at the 1988 Summer Olympics
Olympic gold medalists for the Soviet Union
Olympic footballers of the Soviet Union
Footballers at the 1988 Summer Olympics
Soviet Top League players
Bundesliga players
2. Bundesliga players
Süper Lig players
Ukrainian Premier League players
FC Dnipro players
FC Schalke 04 players
MSV Duisburg players
VfL Bochum players
Bursaspor footballers
Rot-Weiß Oberhausen players
SpVgg Unterhaching players
FSV Salmrohr players
Ukrainian football managers
Russian Premier League managers
Moldovan Super Liga managers
FC Rostov managers
FC Nistru Otaci managers
FC Zugdidi managers
PFC Sumy managers
Soviet expatriate footballers
Ukrainian expatriate footballers
Ukrainian expatriate football managers
Soviet expatriate sportspeople in West Germany
Ukrainian expatriate sportspeople in Germany
Expatriate footballers in Germany
Ukrainian expatriate sportspeople in Turkey
Expatriate footballers in Turkey
Ukrainian expatriate sportspeople in Russia
Expatriate football managers in Russia
Ukrainian expatriate sportspeople in Moldova
Expatriate football managers in Moldova
Ukrainian expatriate sportspeople in Georgia (country)
Expatriate football managers in Georgia (country)
Expatriate footballers in West Germany